Ophichthus echeloides is an eel in the family Ophichthidae (worm/snake eels). It was described by Umberto D'Ancona in 1928. It is a marine, tropical eel which is known from the Gulf of Aqaba and the Red Sea, in the western Indian Ocean.

References

echeloides
Fish described in 1928